Lou-Adriane Cassidy is a Canadian singer-songwriter from Quebec. She is most noted for her song "La fin du monde à tous les jours", which was shortlisted for the 2020 SOCAN Songwriting Prize; she was also the performer of "Ça va ça va", which was a SOCAN Songwriting Prize nominee in 2018 for songwriter Philémon Cimon.

Cassidy was a competitor in the fourth season of La Voix in 2016, competing on Éric Lapointe's team before being eliminated from the competition in episode 10.

In 2018, she was a competitor in the Francouvertes contest, where she and her songwriting collaborators Philémon Cimon and Stéphanie Boulay won the Paroles & Musique Award.

Her debut album, C'est la fin du monde à tous les jours, was released in 2019.

References

21st-century Canadian women singers
Canadian women singer-songwriters
Canadian women pop singers
Singers from Quebec
French-language singers of Canada
French Quebecers
Living people
Year of birth missing (living people)